The Grand Erg Oriental (English: 'Great Eastern Sand Sea') is a large erg or "field of sand dunes" in the Sahara Desert. Situated for the most part in Saharan lowlands of northeast Algeria, the Grand Erg Oriental covers an area some 600 km wide by 200 km north to south. The erg's northeastern edge spills over into neighbouring Tunisia.

Natural phenomena

The Grand Erg Oriental is a desert, a natural region receiving very little rainfall. It is the largest Erg in Algeria, the next in size being the much smaller Grand Erg Occidental ('Western Sand Sea'). The largest erg of the Sahara is probably As-Sahra al-Libiyah, which straddles the inland border of Libya and Egypt. Erg is a Tamachek Berber word, and also a geographic term of art.

The Grand Erg Oriental used to be associated with the Wadi Igharghar, a mostly dry and buried river with a sizable network of tributaries which, should it possess any water, would flow north into the erg from the Ahaggar mountains of the central Sahara. Yet such dry, anciently-made river beds, lying seemingly useless beneath the desert sands, can preserve the infrequent rain water, by carrying it off underground and so rescue the moisture from an otherwise "intense and almost instantaneous" evaporation.

A buried river bed "not only serves in certain cases to carry into the heart of the desert the waters of distant rains which have fallen outside the desert domain, but in it the waters of the local storms are concentrated and carried swiftly to the alluvial basins where they are imbibed by the lighter earth and form lasting reserves within its depths. The result is that what vegetation survives is localized along the wadi beds or in their basins; in fact the words wadi and pasturage are interchangeable in the language of the nomads, who habitually reside in such places."

For these and similar reasons concerning the desert ecology of water, the geographer and historian of the Sahara E.-F. Gautier once wrote referring to the Grand Erg Oriental as "the great Igharghar Erg". Accordingly, surface moisture, seasonal pastures, and wells may reflect unseen conditions beneath the sands. What appears as an entirely inhospitable erg can elsewhere, in stark contrast, offer the fruits of "some buried wadi".

To the north of the erg, the Aurès mountains provide abundant runoff. These waters feed the artesian aquifer of the Jerid, despite its surface covering of salt lakes. These geographic conditions lie adjacent to the Grand Erg Oriental. Here grow "the finest dates of all the Maghrib". In winter, winds blow from the northwest and the north. The Grand Erg Oriental "appears to have been pushed forward on the east and southeast slopes" toward Ghadames at the Libyan border.

Winds over time will sweep desert sand into heaps which, given enough sand, form into a series of hills. In some types of dunes the slope on the windward side is gradual, on the leeward steep, and such dunes may "roll" forward being blown in the direction of the wind is taking. These dunes tend to be perpendicular to the wind's direction. Vegetation does not survive in such spreads of hot dry sand. Only in rare areas where moisture can endure is there life.

Common in the Sahara desert are seif dunes: here the air currents form sand dunes parallel to the prevailing direction of the wind. These dunes have long, sharp ridge lines. Cross-winds, however, may alter the height or width of such lengthy dunes, with the slope being steep on both sides. Seif dunes generally form long rows whose parallel ridge lines follow the wind's direction.

There are other types of dunes, as well as "complex" dunes. Saharan winds are also known to clear an area of sand altogether, leaving bare rock (hamada) or gravel (reg).

Routes, cities, oil industry

The Grand Erg Oriental is accessible overland by an Algerian road, which goes south from Constantine. It passes through the Aurès mountains, then salt lakes by the city of Biskra. Next the road skirts the western edge of the erg. After about 500 km. in all, it reaches the ancient oasis of Ourgla [Wargla]. Since late antiquity Wargla was a stop for the Saharan trade, being situated along a caravan route of several thousand kilometers, stretching from the Mediterranean to the Sahel. In the process such caravans crossed the great desert (Ar: aṣ-ṣaḥrā´ al-kubra). Wargla was the capital of late medieval M'zab, an Ibadi political entity descended from the earlier Rustamid polity. Wargla is today a mid-sized modern city (pop: 129,000) and provincial capital, with a focus on the oil industry.

The above north-south Algerian road from Constantine passes through other oases. North of Wargla [Ourgla] lies Touggourt [Tuggurt, Taghit] (pop: 153,000), where date palms are grown commercially. Touggourt was formerly a medieval Sultanate and a northern oasis on a Trans-Saharan trade route.

South of Wargla on this road, lies Hassi Messaoud ["blessed well"], which is located within the Grand Erg. Until recently Hassi Messaoud was a small Saharan village, but has grown substantially on account of the local discovery of oil in 1956. An oil refinery has since been built, and the city (current population estimated at 60,000) is now served by an international airport.

A desert road going east from Hassi Messaoud continues through the Grand Erg, passing by a well named Bordj Sif Fatima ["Fatima's River Tower" perhaps], on its way to the small but ancient settlement of Ghadames at the Libyan frontier. Another and better road from Hassi Messaoud goes south, also crossing the grand erg where it passes a well called Hassi Tartrat, before reaching the erg's far side. Further south lies the Ahaggar mountains.

The cities of Wargla and Touggourt lie outside the western limits of the erg. Nearby, within the accepted boundaries of the Grand Erg Oriental, the landscape is described as being "practically free from [sand] dunes" evidently due to strong, persistent winds.

Petroleum and other hydrocarbons have been extracted in Algeria, from areas in and surrounding the Grand Erg Oriental. In addition to oil in Wargla and Hassi Messaoud (see above), other Algerian hydrocarbon sites include In Salah, a city (pop: 44,000) to the erg's southwest, yielding natural gas, and also El Adeb Larache, Edjelé, Tingentourine, and Zarzaïtine (south of the erg, close to Libya). One of Algeria's largest field of natural gas is near Ghardaïa, west of Touggourt. Gas pipelines have been constructed north to the Mediterranean port of Bourgie, and later northeast through Tunisia.

Along the north rim of the Grand Erg Oriental, both the physical ecology and the human culture surviving there since ancient times are said to form a continuum. From Biskra (pop: 200,000) in Algeria by the Aurès mountains, this region extends east to the Djerid of Tunisia. It is a low-lying area of chotts (salt pans), and occasional oases, where exists intensive cultivation of date palms in the tens of thousands.<ref>Julia A. Clancy-Smith, Rebel and Saint. Muslim notables, popular protest, colonial encounters (Algeria and Tunisia, 1800-1904), University of California Press 1994, at 13: "[T]he oases from Biskra to the Jarid formed not only a relatively uniform geographical entity but a unified economic and socio-cultural domain as well."</ref> Between Biskra and the Djerid, but a little to the south, lies El Oued, a mid-sized Algerian city (pop: 139,000), graced with domes and arches of Saharan architecture.Oued is a French transliteration of Arabic wadi ["seasonal river"]. Also an oasis, it's located about 100 km. east of Touggourt and by the northern frontier of the erg. The thirst of El Oued is quenched by a subterranean river.

In Tunisia south of the sea port of Gabès, in the vicinity of the Grand Erg's northeast edge, there are a number of Berber villages, among them Tataouine. From here a bleak Tunisian paved road leads south along the Libyan border, by sand dunes of the Grand Erg's eastern limits, terminating at Borj El Khadra, an oasis, near Ghadames.

The ancient oasis town of Ghadames (pop: 7,000) in Libya is located by where the frontiers of Algeria, Tunisia, and Libya meet. The city is situated directly adjacent to the Grand Erg's southeast edge. Tuareg Berbers (a people sourced in the central Sahara) compose the majority in Ghadames. This oasis was known by ancient Egypt, and later by Carthage and by Rome, as Cydamus. A Libyan road from Tarabulus on the Mediterranean coast now leads to present-day Ghadames. The historic Saharan architecture found in its Old Town has received international recognition.

In Algeria Oued Irara Airport at Hassi Messaoud (located in the erg) serves a few international flights and also national flights. Ouargla Airport (OGX) has limited international and national flights. North of the erg Guemar Airport, 20 km. from El Oued, has only national flights. In Libya Ghadames Airport schedules only national flights. In Tunisia Djerba–Zarzis Airport (DJE/DTTJ) serves international and national flights, it being over 100 km. north of the edge of the Grand Erg Oriental.

See also
Grand Erg Occidental
Sahara Desert
Geography of Algeria
Geography of Tunisia
Erg
Dune
List of ergs

References

External links

Grand Erg Oriental 
El Oued
Ghadames
 www.palgeo.ch

Sahara
Landforms of Algeria
Natural regions of Africa
Ergs of Africa